New Bridewell Tower (or New Bridewell) is a 16-storey student accommodation building located in Central Bristol, England. The £30 million development consists of demolishing the former 1970's New Bridewell Police headquarters and the construction of a 499-bed student accommodation building. The development also includes a public square, which provides a link to the nearby old Magistrates court redevelopment, and 600 sq metres of commercial floor space and public realm improvements.

History
The site was previously occupied by the New Bridewell Police headquarters building which was constructed in the 1970s and there were once concrete footbridges, which span over Rupert Street and Nelson Street, that provided a pedestrian link to the Froomsgate House and office buildings located on Nelson Street. In early autumn 2014, the concrete footbridges over Rupert Street were demolished as part of the scheme. The development was completed in late August 2016.

See also
Buildings and architecture of Bristol

References

External links
Official website

Buildings and structures in Bristol